McLardie is a surname.  Notable people with the surname include:

 Archibald McLardie, Scottish footballer of the 1910s and 1920s
 Archibald McLardie (footballer, born 1889) (1889–1915), Scottish footballer

See also
 McCardie
 McLardy